Plymouth Council could refer to:

Plymouth City Council, England
Plymouth Council for New England, North America
Plymouth Council (Boy Scouts of America), a defunct local council of the Boy Scouts of America